The 2014–15 Western Sydney Wanderers FC season was the club's third season since its establishment in 2012. The club participated in the A-League for the third time, the FFA Cup for the first time, the AFC Champions League for the second time and the FIFA Club World Cup for the first time.

The Wanderers' competitive season began with the 2014 FFA Cup during August 2014. Their 2014–15 A-League season commenced in October 2014, and the 2015 AFC Champions League in February 2015.

In addition, the Wanderers continued their 2014 AFC Champions League campaign from the previous season on 20 August 2014, due to the calendar format of the continental tournament not matching directly with the A-League schedule. The Wanderers won the final, which took place on 1 November 2014, with several A-League games rescheduled as a result.

Season overview
On 14 May 2014, Youssouf Hersi and Shinji Ono departed from Western Sydney Wanderers after signing with Perth Glory and second division Japanese side Consadole Sapporo respectively. On 17 May, Matthew Špiranović extended his contract with the club for a further two seasons, until 2016. On 21 May, nine players concluded their contracts with the club; Adam D'Apuzzo, Michael Beauchamp, Jérome Polenz, Aaron Mooy, Tahj Minniecon, Josh Barresi, Jerrad Tyson and Dean Heffernan. On 21 May, Jason Trifiro extended his contract with the club for a further seasons, until 2015, additionally Daniel Alessi and Alusine Fofanah each signed two year senior contracts, until 2016, from the club's youth squad. On 26 May, Antony Golec extended his contract with the club for a further seasons, until 2015. On 27 May, Dean Bouzanis joined Wanderers from Carlisle United on two season contract, until 2016. On 12 June, Nikolai Topor-Stanley re-signed on a three-year deal, to keep him at the club until 2017. On 20 June 2014, the club signed Brazilian midfielder Vítor Saba from Italian side Brescia on a two-year contract. On 26 June Wanderers signed defender Brendan Hamill on a one-year contract from South Korean club Seongnam. On 19 July 2014, Wanderers signed Romeo Castelen on a two-year contract.

On 26 January 2015, Saba left Western Syeny Wanderers, with the players contract terminated by mutual consent .

Players

Squad information

From youth squad

Transfers in

Transfers out

Technical staff

Statistics

Squad statistics

|-
|colspan="29"|Players no longer at the club:

Pre-season and friendlies

Competitions

Overall

A-League

League table

Results summary

Results by round

Matches

FFA Cup

AFC Champions League

Group stage

FIFA Club World Cup

References

External links
 Official Website

Western Sydney Wanderers
Western Sydney Wanderers FC seasons